Zenonia crasta is a butterfly in the family Hesperiidae. It is found in the eastern part of the Democratic Republic of the Congo, south-western Uganda, Rwanda and Burundi.

References

Hesperiinae
Butterflies of Africa
Lepidoptera of the Democratic Republic of the Congo
Lepidoptera of Uganda
Butterflies described in 1937